Li Xuemei (born February 1, 1977, in Guanghan, Sichuan) is a retired Chinese sprinter. She is the fastest Asian woman in history with a personal best time of 10.79 in the 100m and a 22.01 in the 200m, both ran during the National Games of China.

Early years

Coming from a modest family, she started practising athletics in 1988 at the Guanghan Amateur Sports School.

At the age of 18, Li easily won the 100m (11.36) and the 200m (22.93, national junior record) at the Chinese City Games, a quadrennial competition for athletes under 21.

One year later, she took part to the World Junior Championships in both events and was eliminated in the first round.

World Championships and 1997 National Games of China
In June 1997, during the Chinese Championships held in Chengdu, Li broke the Chinese record on 100m in 11.05 s and won the 200m in 22.60 s, setting a new personal best in the process. She was part of the Sichuan 4 x 100 m team which broke the Chinese record in 43.13 seconds.

She was selected for the World Championships in August, where she was eliminated in the second round both on 100m and 200m. However, she broke Chen Zhaojing's Asian record in the 200m heats, clocking a strong 22.44s.
Together with Pei Fang, Yan Jiankui and Liu Xiaomei, they managed to reach the 4 x 100m final, where they finished eighth and last.

Two months later, Li participated to the National Games of China in Shanghai, representing Sichuan.
On the 100m event, she won her heat in 10.90s, breaking her own Asian and national record. She crossed the line in 11.03s to qualify for the final, beating the Guangxi experimented sprinter Tian Yumei and one of Sichuan's top runner Li Yali, who both set new personal bests.

In a terrific final, she once again smashed her record in 10.79s to take the gold medal. This astonishing time ranked her second behind Marion Jones in 1997.
Her teammate Liu Xiaomei finished second in 10.89s and Tian Yumei completed the podium in 11.06s.

Four days later, Li made it to the top again, winning the 200m final in 22.01s, shattering her own area record. Liu Xiaomei finished again second of the race in 22.36s while 1995 World Student 200m champion Du Xiujie finished third in 22.56.

Quartet composed of Xiao Lin, Li Yali, Liu Xiaomei and Li Xuemei won the 4 x 100m relay in 42.23s, showing Sichuan's supremacy in women sprinting events.

In 1998, Li ran a 10.95s in Beijing and competed in European meetings, such as Rome's Golden Gala, Oslo's Bislett Games and also participated to the Goodwill Games, where she finished last in the 100m event. Her best performance of the year was a gold medal on 100m at the Asian Games where she also took the silver medal on the 200m, won by Damayanthi Darsha.

Mixed results

Li participated to the World Indoor Championships on the 60m event, where she failed to advance to the second round. She almost did not compete during the 1999 outdoor season, as she only ran a 100m in a Hongkongese meeting in July. She won the race in 11.46s, far from her 1997 results.

2000, Olympic year, saw mixed results from Li. She just set a season best of 11.25s on 100m, achieved during the Olympics, where she was knocked out in the second round. She was part of the Chinese 4 x 100m team, composed of Zeng Xiujun, junior Qin Wangping and Liu Xiaomei, which qualified for the final, where the team finished last in a poor result because of a last disastrous baton exchange between Qin and Li.

The 2001 season was better; Li took part to the World Indoor Championships, where she set a new area record on 60m in the semi-finals, clocking a time of 7.19s that still stands today. She finished seventh of the final in 7.20s.

In May, she took the silver medal at the East Asian Games on 100m eventually won by her teammate Zeng Xiujun.

In August, Li won the 200m at the World Student Games in 22.86s, beating Belgium star Kim Gevaert and Belarus Natalia Safronnikava. China's 4 x 100m team composed of Li, Chen Yueqin, Yan Jiankui and Zeng Xiujun dominated the final to beat Brazil and France which respectively won silver and bronze.

Three months later, the National Games of China, held in Guangzhou were Li's great season conclusion. In the 100m and 200m events, the first two places replicated the 1997 races: Li won the gold medals in 11.14s and 22.75s and Liu Xiaomei silver in 11.22s and 23.15s; both recording seasonal bests. Chen Yueqin from Hainan took the bronze in the 100m event and Chen Yuxiang did the same on 200m.
Sichuan 4 x 100m team, anchored by Li, won the final in 43.18s.

Injuries and comeback

Li did not compete in 2002 and 2003. The Guangzhou National Games remained her last competitive effort.
Since 1997, she has struggled with injuries and it took a long time for regaining her form.

She came back in 2004, where she won the 100m and 200m events of the Chinese Championships held in Shijiazhuang in May. Even though the Chinese Athletics Federation was reluctant to send her to the Olympics because of her mixed results she achieved that year; she was selected, but only on 100m.
She finished seventh of her heat in the first round in a mediocre time of 12.21s and could not advance to the second round.

In March 2005, Li finished third of the 60m event of the annual traditional China vs Japan meeting, clocking a 7.47s.
The same year, she took part to the Chinese Championships on 100m where she was eliminated in the first round.

Li's last competition of the year was the National Games of China in Nanjing. She was not in shape to face China's rising stars and could not defend her 1997 and 2001 titles on 100m, 200m and 4 x 100m.
Only participating individually in the 100m event, she finished third of her heat in the first round, setting a seasonal best of 11.72s. In the semi-finals, Li finished eighth and last of her heat, crossing the line in a disappointing time of 11.98s.

Together with Leng Mei, Shu Yan and Zeng Xiujun, Li finished fourth of the 4 x 100m final in 44.93s.

Li Xuemei retired in February 2006, unhappy of her last results and disturbed by injuries. Nowadays, she still remains the fastest Asian woman in history.

Achievements

References 

1977 births
Living people
Athletes (track and field) at the 1998 Asian Games
Athletes (track and field) at the 2000 Summer Olympics
Athletes (track and field) at the 2004 Summer Olympics
Chinese female sprinters
Olympic athletes of China
People from Deyang
Asian Games medalists in athletics (track and field)
Runners from Sichuan
Universiade medalists in athletics (track and field)
Asian Games gold medalists for China
Asian Games silver medalists for China
Medalists at the 1998 Asian Games
Universiade gold medalists for China
Medalists at the 2001 Summer Universiade
Competitors at the 1998 Goodwill Games
Olympic female sprinters
21st-century Chinese women